Marcus Lindblom (born February 7, 1995) is a Swedish professional ice hockey player for Strömsbro IF of the Hockeyettan. His younger brother, Oskar is also a professional hockey player for the San Jose Sharks.

Lindblom made his Swedish Hockey League debut playing with Brynäs IF during the 2014–15 SHL season.

References

External links

1995 births
Living people
Almtuna IS players
Brynäs IF players
Swedish ice hockey centres
People from Gävle
Sportspeople from Gävleborg County